Podkopayev or Podkopaev (Russian: Подкопаев) is a Russian masculine surname, its feminine counterpart is Podkopayeva or Podkopaeva. The surname may refer to the following notable people:
Anna Podkopayeva (née Malova in 1990), Russian volleyball player
Lilia Podkopayeva (born 1978), Ukrainian artistic gymnast
Ola Podkopayeva, from coldwater school
Yekaterina Podkopayeva (born 1952), Russian middle-distance runner 

Russian-language surnames